Nõmmik is an Estonian surname. Notable people with the surname include:

 Sulev Nõmmik (1931–1992), Estonian actor and comedian
 Raivo Nõmmik (born 1977), Estonian footballer

Estonian-language surnames